Qaleh Shisheh (also Romanized as Qal‘eh Shīsheh and Qal‘eh-ye Shīsheh) is a village in Belharat Rural District, Miyan Jolgeh District, Nishapur County, Razavi Khorasan Province, Iran. At the 2006 census, its population was 377, in 93 families.

References 

Populated places in Nishapur County